The 2001 Vuelta a Asturias was the 45th edition of the Vuelta a Asturias road cycling stage race, which was held from 15 May to 20 May 2001. The race started in Oviedo and finished at the Alto del Naranco. The race was won by Juan Carlos Domínguez of the  team.

General classification

References

Vuelta Asturias
2001 in road cycling
2001 in Spanish sport